Mundane is a science fiction subculture term.

Mundane may also refer to:

 Carri Mundane, English fashion designer
 Journal of Mundane Behavior, a sociological journal devoted to everyday experience.
 Mundane astrology,  the application of astrology to world affairs and world events
 Mundane Egg, a creation myth in various ancient cultures
 Mundane reason, a philosophical concept
 Mundane science fiction, a subgenre of science fiction